Patrick de Lucca Chaves de Oliveira (born 2 March 2000), known as Patrick de Lucca or simply Patrick, is a Brazilian professional footballer who plays for Vasco da Gama. Mainly a defensive midfielder, he can also play as a centre back.

Club career
Born in São Paulo, Patrick started his career with Palmeiras, but announced his departure from the club in March 2020 after nearly five years in their youth setup. In August of that year, he signed for Bahia and was initially assigned to the under-20s.

After impressing in the under-20s and switching his position from central defender to defensive midfielder, Patrick made his first team – and Série A debut on 13 February 2021, starting in a 1–1 away draw against Atlético Mineiro. He was a starter in the subsequent two matches, as the club avoided relegation.

On 6 March 2021, now fully integrated to the main squad, Patrick scored his first senior goal, netting a last-minute equalizer in a 1–1 Copa do Nordeste home draw against Botafogo da Paraíba. On the 25th, he renewed his contract until December 2022.

Career statistics

References

External links
 Bahia official profile 

2000 births
Living people
Footballers from São Paulo
Brazilian footballers
Association football midfielders
Campeonato Brasileiro Série A players
Campeonato Brasileiro Série B players
Esporte Clube Bahia players
CR Vasco da Gama players